Lestoidea brevicauda is a species of Australian damselfly in the family Lestoideidae,
commonly known as a short-tipped bluestreak. 
It is endemic to north-east Queensland, where it inhabits streams in rainforest.

Lestoidea brevicauda is a medium-sized to large damselfly, dark coloured with dull orange to greenish markings.

Etymology
The species name brevicauda is derived from two Latin words: brevis meaning short; and cauda meaning tail. In 1996 Theischinger named this species with regard to the short appendages at the tip of the male abdomen.

Gallery

See also
 List of Odonata species of Australia

References 

Lestoideidae
Odonata of Australia
Insects of Australia
Endemic fauna of Australia
Taxa named by Günther Theischinger
Insects described in 1996
Damselflies